Two ships of the Royal Navy have been named HMS P38.

 , a P-class patrol boat launched in 1917. Renamed HMS Spey on 11 December 1925 and assigned to fishery protection, the vessel was sold in May 1938.
 , a U-class submarine launched in July 1941 and sunk on 23 February 1942 by the Italian torpedo boat Circe north of Tripoli, Libya.

References
 
  
 
 

Royal Navy ship names